Caernarfon Station is the northern terminus of the narrow gauge Welsh Highland Railway, located in the town of Caernarfon. It was opened on 11 October 1997 when the line was constructed from Dinas.

History 
The railway between Caernarfon and Dinas was formerly part of the standard gauge Carnarvonshire Railway, later LNWR and LMS, between Caernarfon and Afon Wen, which was closed by British Railways in December 1964, and the tracks lifted.

Northwards of the present Caernarfon station, the former standard gauge line ran through a tunnel, which is now used by a public road, to the site of the original Caernarvon railway station. The LNWR was under an obligation to build a station on this site (below Segontium Terrace), however the town corporation waived its claim to this station. The original line continued on to a junction with the Chester and Holyhead Railway just south of the Britannia Bridge, terminating at the now-demolished Menai Bridge station.

Opening 
The present station is sited on the former standard gauge trackbed adjacent to St. Helen's Road, opposite the former locomotive works of De Winton & Co and beneath the high retaining walls of Segontium Terrace, which can be reached from St Helen's Road via a pedestrian footbridge. The station buildings accommodate the booking office, a tourist shop and passenger facilities. In the winter of 2005/06 the passenger platform and run around loop at Caernarfon were lengthened to permit the operation of trains up to 10 carriages long.

The narrow gauge line was built from Dinas to Caernarfon in 1997, thus providing the extension to Caernarfon of the Welsh Highland Railway that was originally authorised by Act of Parliament, but never built. Between Caernarfon and Dinas, the new Welsh Highland line shares the old standard gauge trackbed with the 'Lôn Eifion' tourist cycle track. This section of line is operated by the Ffestiniog Railway under the provisions of The Caernarfon Railway Light Railway Order 1997 made 8 October 1997.

A new station to a modern design was built during 2018 and 2019 and was first used for Sion Corn (Santa Claus) trains in December 2018.

Gallery

References

Notes

Sources

External links
The Welsh Highland Railway Project - official reconstruction site
Ffestiniog and Welsh Highland Railways Homepage
Rebuilding The Welsh Highland Railway - an independent site
Welsh Highland Railway Timetables
Multimap Map of Caernarfon

Heritage railway stations in Gwynedd
Welsh Highland Railway
Railway stations in Great Britain opened in 1997
Caernarfon
Railway stations built for UK heritage railways